The 1970–71 Hellenic Football League season was the 18th in the history of the Hellenic Football League, a football competition in England.

Premier Division

The Premier Division featured 15 clubs which competed in the division last season, along with three new clubs:
Clanfield, promoted from Division One
Moreton Town, joined from the Cheltenham League
Wantage Town, promoted from Division One

League table

Division One

The Division One featured 17 clubs which competed in the division last season, along with 3 new clubs:
Chipping Norton Town, relegated from the Premier Division
Hazells, relegated from the Premier Division
Fairford Town, joined from the Swindon & District League

League table

References

External links
 Hellenic Football League

1970-71
H